Benjamin Brown (born 20 November 1992) is an Australian rules footballer who plays for the Melbourne Football Club in the Australian Football League (AFL). He previously played for the North Melbourne Football Club.

Brown has become particularly well known for his unique, extremely long run up on set shots.

Career
Brown played his junior football for Devonport Football Club, then played for Glenorchy Football Club in the Tasmanian State League before being selected 47th overall by North Melbourne in the 2013 national draft. After a development stint at then-Kangaroos affiliate Werribee in the VFL, Brown made his AFL debut in round 14, 2014 against Melbourne, kicking a goal and impressing coach Brad Scott enough to keep his spot the following week. Brown went on to be an influential player in the North Melbourne team in the latter stages of the season, with strong performances in the finals series. He finished the 2014 season with 18 goals, improving in 2015 with 32 and once again in 2016 when he kicked 41 for the season and captured North Melbourne's leading goal kicker award for the first time.

In 2017, Brown kicked a career best 63 goals, allowing him to win North Melbourne's leading goal kicker award for the second straight year. Brown also finished third in the 2017 Coleman Medal behind Josh Kennedy (65) and Lance Franklin (69), with his form also paving the way to a spot in the preliminary 40-man All Australian squad. In 2018, Brown kicked 61 goals from 22 games, finishing second in the Coleman Medal behind Richmond’s Jack Riewoldt and once again being selected in the 40-man All-Australian team.

In round 22 of the 2019 season, Brown kicked a career high 10 goals in a 144–58 win over Port Adelaide. Brown became the first North Melbourne player to kick double-digit goals in a game since Wayne Carey did so back in 1999. He finished the 2019 season having kicked a career best 64 goals from 22 games, finishing second in the Coleman medal for a second year running behind Greater Western Sydney's Jeremy Cameron (67) and won the North Melbourne goal kicking award for the fourth year in a row. He again gained selection in the initial 40-man All-Australian team for the third year in a row but was again passed over for the final 22.

During the 2017, 2018 and 2019 home and away seasons Brown finished 3rd, 2nd and 2nd respectively in the Coleman Medal and kicked a combined total of 188 goals across 66 games, the most of any player in the AFL over that time period.

After a 2020 season hampered by injury in which he only played 9 games and kicked 8 goals, Brown was put up for trade by North Melbourne.

After an injury-hampered start to the 2021 season, Brown became a mainstay of the Demons’ forward line in the second half of the year and throughout the Demons’ finals campaign. Brown scored three goals in Melbourne's 2021 AFL Grand Final win.

Personal life

Brown is the grandson of footballer and politician Jim Manson and nephew of former Collingwood player James Manson.

Brown married Hester Mary MacKinnon on 14 October 2017, and they have two daughters.

Brown is a vegan and an advocate for greater action on climate change.

Statistics
Updated to the end of the 2022 season.

|-
| 2014 ||  || 50
| 11 || 18 || 9 || 66 || 41 || 107 || 49 || 17 || 1.6 || 0.8 || 6.0 || 3.7 || 9.7 || 4.5 || 1.5 || 1
|- 
| 2015 ||  || 50
| 22 || 32 || 17 || 152 || 72 || 224 || 99 || 21 || 1.5 || 0.8 || 6.9 || 3.3 || 10.2 || 4.5 || 1.0 || 2
|-
| 2016 ||  || 50
| 22 || 41 || 18 || 174 || 65 || 239 || 115 || 28 || 1.9 || 0.8 || 7.9 || 3.0 || 10.9 || 5.2 || 1.3 || 0
|- 
| 2017 ||  || 50
| 22 || 63 || 30 || 180 || 76 || 256 || 120 || 27 || 2.9 || 1.4 || 8.2 || 3.5 || 11.6 || 5.5 || 1.2 || 14
|-
| 2018 ||  || 50
| 22 || 61 || 24 || 186 || 60 || 246 || 100 || 24 || 2.8 || 1.1 || 8.5 || 2.7 || 11.2 || 4.5 || 1.1 || 6
|- 
| 2019 ||  || 50
| 22 || 64 || 34 || 187 || 57 || 244 || 108 || 25 || 2.9 || 1.5 || 8.5 || 2.6 || 11.1 || 4.9 || 0.3 || 8
|-
| 2020 ||  || 50
| 9 || 8 || 8 || 49 || 13 || 62 || 31 || 6 || 0.9 || 0.9 || 5.4 || 1.4 || 6.9 || 3.4 || 0.7 || 0
|- 
| scope=row bgcolor=F0E68C | 2021# ||  || 50
| 13 || 25 || 13 || 102 || 24 || 126 || 69 || 20 || 1.9 || 1.0 || 7.8 || 1.8 || 9.7 || 5.3 || 1.5 || 0
|-
| 2022 ||  || 50
| 19 || 30 || 19 || 114 || 59 || 173 || 79 || 17 || 1.6 || 1.0 || 6.0 || 3.1 || 9.1 || 4.2 || 0.9 || 0
|- class=sortbottom
! colspan=3 | Career
! 162 !! 342 !! 172 !! 1210 !! 467 !! 1677 !! 770 !! 185 !! 2.1 !! 1.1 !! 7.5 !! 2.9 !! 10.4 !! 4.8 !! 1.1 !! 31
|}

Notes

Honours and achievements
Team
 AFL premiership player: 2021
 McClelland Trophy: 2021

Individual
 4× North Melbourne Leading Goalkicker: 2016, 2017, 2018, 2019
 Australia international rules football team: 2017
 Ian Ridley Memorial Trophy: 2021

References

External links

1992 births
North Melbourne Football Club players
Werribee Football Club players
Australian rules footballers from Tasmania
Living people
People from Devonport, Tasmania
Glenorchy Football Club players
Devonport Football Club players
Australia international rules football team players
Melbourne Football Club players
Melbourne Football Club Premiership players
One-time VFL/AFL Premiership players